The Rochester Knighthawks were a lacrosse team based in Rochester, New York, that played in the National Lacrosse League (NLL). The 2008 season was the 14th in franchise history.

After finishing the 2007 season with a 14-game winning stream winning the Champion's Cup, the Knighthawks hoped to continue their success into 2008. They continued their winning streak by beating the Buffalo Bandits in the season opener, but then lost the next three. The Knighthawks finished with an 8-8 record, good for 5th place in the Eastern division, and missed the playoffs for the first time in franchise history.

Regular season

Conference standings

Game log
Reference:

Player stats
Reference:

Runners (Top 10)

Note: GP = Games played; G = Goals; A = Assists; Pts = Points; LB = Loose balls; PIM = Penalty minutes

Goaltenders
Note: GP = Games played; MIN = Minutes; W = Wins; L = Losses; GA = Goals against; Sv% = Save percentage; GAA = Goals against average

Awards

Roster
Reference:

See also
2008 NLL season

References

Rochester
Rochester Knighthawks